"Love Don't Let Me Go" is a song performed by French DJ and producer David Guetta, featuring vocals from singer and long-time collaborator Chris Willis. The track was released as the second single from his debut studio album, Just a Little More Love, although served as the album's lead single in the United Kingdom. The main remix of the song, "Love Don't Let Me Go (Walking Away)", was also released as single in 2006.

Music video
A music video for the track was released in January 2002, at a total length of two minutes and fifty-five seconds. The video features a hologram of Guetta in space, but once again, does not feature Chris Willis.

Track listing

 French CD single (2002)
 "Love Don't Let Me Go" (main mix) – 7:25
 "Love Don't Let Me Go" (house remix) – 5:28
 "Love Don't Let Me Go" (1987 Rister Remix) – 6:46
 "Love Don't Let Me Go" (Scream Mix) – 8:01
 "Love Don't Let Me Go" (single edit) – 3:39

 UK CD single (2002)
 "Love Don't Let Me Go" (single edit) – 3:39
 "Love Don't Let Me Go" (house remix) – 5:28
 "Love Don't Let Me Go" (Belamour Remix) – 5:51
 "Love Don't Let Me Go" (music video)

 German CD single (2002)
 "Love Don't Let Me Go" (single edit) – 3:39
 "Love Don't Let Me Go" (house remix edit) – 3:52

Charts and certifications

Weekly charts

Year-end charts

Certifications

References

2002 singles
David Guetta songs
Songs written by David Guetta
Songs written by Joachim Garraud
Songs written by Chris Willis
Chris Willis songs
Song recordings produced by David Guetta